Valide Mosque or Valide Sultan Mosque can refer to:

 Atik Valide Mosque, in Istanbul, Turkey
 New Valide Sultan Mosque, in Istanbul, Turkey
 Pertevniyal Valide Sultan Mosque, in Istanbul, Turkey
 Yeni Valide Mosque, in the Üsküdar district of Istanbul, Turkey
 Valide Mosque, in Mytilene, Greece
 Valie Sultan Mosque in Rethymno, Greece, of which only the minaret remains today